Kamenz or Kamjenc (Sorbian) is a town (Große Kreisstadt) in the district of Bautzen in Saxony, Germany. Until 2008 it was the administrative seat of Kamenz District. The town is known as the birthplace of the philosopher and poet Gotthold Ephraim Lessing and Bruno Hauptmann, convicted kidnapper of the Lindbergh baby. It lies north-east of the major city of Dresden.

Geography

Situated on the Black Elster river, between the West Lusatian Hills and the Lusatian Highlands rising in the south, the town was built on greywacke and granite rocks which were mined here for centuries. Kamenz railway station is the terminus of Lübbenau–Kamenz and Kamenz–Pirna railway lines. It is served by Regionalbahn trains from Dresden Hauptbahnhof, operated by the Städtebahn Sachsen.
It is known for its major rhododendron and azalea collections flowering at Pentecost. In 1864 the Lessing Tower was erected on the hilltop, offering a panoramic view over the West Lusatian lands and the Upper Lusatian Heath and Pond Landscape in the north. About 32% of the nature in former Kamenz District is under protection, including a network of routes for riding by bicycle and hiking.

Divisions

The town Kamenz consists of Thale Kamenz and the following Ortschaften or municipal divisions:

Bernbruch
Biehla
Brauna (incl. Liebenau, Petershain, Rohrbach and Schwosdorf)
Cunnersdorf (incl. Hausdorf and Schönbach)
Deutschbaselitz/Němske Pazlicy
Jesau/Jěžow
Lückersdorf-Gelenau (Lückersdorf, Gelenau and Hennersdorf)
Thonberg/Hlinowc
Wiesa/Brěznja
Zschornau-Schiedel (Zschornau/Čornow and Schiedel)

History 
The settlement arose in the late 12th century, when a fortress was erected at the location of today's old town, in order to secure the junction of the medieval Via Regia trade route with the Black Elster river. From here, the Via Regia offered important transport links from the Low Countries up to Silesia.

In 1225, written records first mentioned the town; Kamenz became an independent city in 1319, when Holy Roman Emperor Louis IV enfeoffed the West Lusatian lands to the Luxembourg king John of Bohemia. In 1346, the citizens joined the Lusatian League for protection against robber barons and to maintain public peace (Landfrieden). The town was nevertheless besieged and finally occupied by Hussite forces in 1429, who also devastated the nearby town of Wittichenau before they marched against Bautzen. In 1493, King Vladislaus II of Bohemia had a Franciscan monastery established north of the Kamenz town walls, dedicated to Saint Anne in 1512.

Kamenz citizens officially turned Protestant in 1536. In the Schmalkaldic War of 1546/47, the Upper Lusatian towns refused to support the troops of the Habsburg emperor Ferdinand I against the Protestant princes and were penalised with the loss of numerous privileges. The Franciscan convent finally dissolved in 1564.

With the 1635 Peace of Prague, the Lusatias passed from the Bohemian Crown to the Electorate of Saxony. Several witch-hunts are documented in the 17th century. In 1707 a fire destroyed large parts of the old town. A second major fire on 4 and 5 August 1842 destroyed much of the city.

In 1896, Kamenz became garrison town of the Königlich Sächsisches Reserve-Infanterie-Regiment Nr. 242, part of the German 53rd Reserve Division. During World War II a subcamp of Gross-Rosen concentration camp was located in the town from 1944 to 1945, where forced labourers worked for a Daimler-Benz aircraft engine factory. The airfield northeast of the town was used by Luftwaffe Schlachtgeschwader 2 and Sturzkampfgeschwader 77 units.

After the war, the town became part of the Soviet occupation zone and East Germany. Until 1990, an officer candidate school of the East German Air Force Staff (Offiziershochschule Franz Mehring) was located at the Kamenz Airfield. The former municipality Schönteichen was merged into Kamenz in January 2019.

Politics

Seats in the city council (Stadtrat) as of 2014 local elections:
Christian Democratic Union of Germany (CDU): 7
The Left: 7
Wählervereinigung Kamenz und Ortsteile (Independent): 3
Wir für Kamenz (Independent): 2
National Democratic Party of Germany (NPD): 1
Free Democratic Party: 1
Alliance '90/The Greens: 1

Twin towns — sister cities

Kamenz is twinned with:
 Alzey, Germany
 Kolín, Czech Republic
 Karpacz, Poland

Sights

Theatre
 The municipal theatre (Stadttheater) was re-opened in 1999; it is also used for Kabarett and concert performances
 Within the Hutberg landscape park, an open-air stage for up to 10,000 visitors was built in 1934/35 as a Thingplatz; it is today used for music events.

Museums
 Lessing Museum, opened in 1931, memorial site and library
 St Anna abbey church and sacred museum (Klosterkirche und Sakralmuseum St. Annen), part of the former Franciscan convent, exhibits sacred art of the Kamenz churches - a collection of 16th century carved timber painted altarpieces
 Museum of West Lusatia (Museum der Westlausitz): various collections on cultural history, archaeology, geology, zoology, and botany of the region.

Buildings

 Town hall, built in 1848/49, in an Italian Neo-Renaissance style
 Marketplace with Mannerist Andreas Fountain, erected in 1570
 Roter Turm (red tower), Mönchsmauer (monk wall), and Pichschuppen, all remnants of the medieval town fortification
 The Protestant main church of St Mary was built from 1275 to 1479, in a Late Gothic hall church style; it is the only church built from granite rocks north of the Alps
 The nearby Catechism Church at the town wall was first mentioned in 1358; it was later used for religious services held in the Sorbian language
 The St Anne Abbey Church was finished in 1510, now a museum whose collections include five 16th century carved wood altarpieces
 The St Just Church on the historic Via Regia road, first mentioned in 1377, contains several mural paintings from about 1400
 The Lessing memorial marks the place of the poet's birth house.

Events
 Blütenlauf auf dem Hutberg (Run on the Hutberg)
 Lessing Days (every year, January and February)
 Fête de la Musique every year on June 21
 Forstfest (Forest Festival), every year in the week of August 24 on St Bartholomew's Day
 Kamenzer Nasenfest (Nose Festival), Festival with the so-called nose market every year on October 3
 Carnival
 Popular German band Silbermond, originally from the nearby town of Bautzen, have made it a personal tradition to play the final concert of their album tours at Kamenz's Hutbergbühne stadium.

Notable people

 Andreas Dressler (1530-1604), a highly skilled local artist
 Gotthold Ephraim Lessing (1729–1781), philosopher and poet.
 Gottfried von Erdmannsdorff (1893–1946), German Nazi officer executed for war crimes
 Richard Hauptmann (1899–1936), convicted kidnapper of the Lindbergh baby
 Hans Thamm (1921–2007), choral conductor
 Georg Baselitz (born 1938), painter, born in Deutschbaselitz
 Wolfgang Mager (born 1952), rower, two-time Olympic gold medalist

References

External links 

Municipal site 
Kamenz at oberlausitz.com

Museum of West Lusatia 
Lessing Museum 

 
Populated places in Bautzen (district)
West Lusatia